The Wake is an American gothic rock band from Columbus, Ohio, United States.

The Wake has been featured on thirty plus compilations worldwide. The band has opened for bands such as NIN, Skinny Puppy, Christian Death, Innocence Mission, Alien Sex Fiend, And Also the Trees, and Shadow Project - touring extensively in the US and playing dates in Europe and Mexico.

History
Formed in 1986 by vocalist Troy Payne and guitarist Richard Witherspoon in Columbus, Ohio USA – The Wake made its first studio recording Procession using session musicians on drums and bass in 1987.  Bassist James Tramel and electronic drummer Scott Rozanski were recruited later the same year.

Drummer Daniel C. replaced Rozanski early in 1989. Keyboardist Robert Brothers joined the band in 1990. The band released their 7” vinyl single "Harlot" in 1990.

Following on the success of “Harlot”, the band released a second 7” – Sideshow on the Blaylox Records label in 1992, then signed with Cleopatra Records in 1993. The Wake's debut album “Masked” was released in October 1993.

After the completion of the “Masked” tour, the band parted ways with bass player James Tramel. Bassist Steven Creighton joined before the release of the Christine EP in 1995. The EP had a decidedly industrial/dance flavor, thanks in part to the re-mixes supplied by Rosetta Stone. The single "Christine" (mixed by The Wake and Zane Eric Brown) broke onto the top ten of Alternative Press's Dance Club charts where it remained for months. Also in ‘95, the still popular "Christine" video was filmed in and around Mexico City during the tour supporting the EP.

In 1996, The Wake joined forces with former Ministry engineer "Fluffy" on their third CD – Nine Ways. The album was recorded and mixed at both Chicago Trax, and the Chicago Recording Company.

Just before the release of Nine Ways, guitarist and co-founder Rich Witherspoon left the band and former MCA recording artist Mark Gamiere was enlisted to take over at guitar. Though no studio recordings were made with this lineup, Gamiere provided live tour support from 1996 to 2000. Other lineup changes include the late J.T. Murphy replacing Steven Creighton on bass in 1998. The band turned bass playing duty over to a hard-disk recorder in 1999 before giving way to a hiatus in 2000.

Released on Blaylox Records in 2010 - The Wake's single "Emily Closer" features the reunited lineup of Payne, Witherspoon, Tramel, Brothers, and Daniel C. and was recorded and self-produced before being mastered by Howie Weinberg at Masterdisk.

December 2013, The Wake announce the imminent release of a new single - "Rusted" and remix by musician/producer John Fryer. Released on Blaylox Records, the single features the lineup of Troy Payne, Rich Witherspoon, and Daniel C..

Discography

Releases
“the Wake” (’90) Cassette Blay691 (Blaylox Records) USA
“Harlot” B/W “Suicide” (’90) 7” Red & Black Vinyl Limited 1000 Blay69 ( Records) USA 
“On the Ghost Train” (’91) Live Video Blay692gtv ( Records) USA
“The Wake” (’92) 4 Song Digital Re-Master “Limited Nms” Cassette Blay0696 ( Records) USA
“Sideshow” B/W “audrey” (’92) 7” Purple & Black Vinyl Limited 1000 Blay0698 ( Records) USA
“Masked” (’93) CD & Cassette Cleo 09187-2 (Cleopatra Records) USA
“Christine Ep” (’95) CD Cleo 09640-2 (Cleopatra Records) USA
“Nine Ways” (’96) CD Cleo 09708-2 (Cleopatra Records) USA
“Blacklist” (’08) Dvd (mvd/cleopatra Records) USA
"Emily Closer" ('10) DD Blay 859703130695 (Blaylox Records) USA
"Rusted" ('14) DD Blay 859711730504 (Blaylox Records) USA
"Rusted (John Fryer Remix)" ('14) DD Blay 859711731136 (Blaylox Records) USA

Compilation appearances
 “Burial” (’89) Sprogg Magazine Compilation Cass USA
“Nazarene” (’91) Aesthetics Magazine Live Video USA
"Nazarene" ('91) Various - Gotham Cass USA
“Harlot” (’92) Screams Of Torture Cass Nct93-107 Germany
“Locomotive Age” (’93) Cold Tears/Darkland Of Tears Cass France
“Audrey” (’93) L’appel De La Muse, Vol Iii  CD Aje-08 France
“Harlot” (’93) The Whip Freud CD 043 (Jungle Records) Uk
“Silent Siren” (’94) The Fallen Angel CD Msrp002 (zoth Ommog) Germany
“Nazarene” (’94) Mysterious Encounters CD Cleo 06808-2 USA
“Locomotive Age” (’94) In Goth Daze CD Cleo 09400-2 USA
“Locomotive Age” (‘94) New Alternatives 2 CD (Nightbreed Records) Uk
“Sideshow” (’95) Gothik CD Cleo 09536-2 USA
“Watchtower” (’95) Stars, Hide Your Fires CD (Hyperium) Germany
“Christine” (’95) Gothic Rock 2 CD Cleo 09648-2 USA
“Christine” (’96) Wired Injection CD Cleo 09675-2 USA
“Control” (’96) Goth Box CD Cleo 09798-2 USA
“Christine” (’96) Goth Box Video (tHE Visual Companion) Dvd Cleo 9800 USA
“Watchtower 2.1 Mix” (‘97) Goth’s Undead CD Cleo 00038 USA
“Christine” (’97) Goth's Paradise The Black Book Compilation Vol.1 CD (orkus) Germany
“Procession” (’97) Songs to Wake the Dead CD (cleo\blackrat) USA
“Lightning” (’98) German Mystic Sound Sampler Vol. Vii Zillo CD Germany
“Christine” (’98) Undercurrents ’98 CD USA
“Nazarene” (’98) Gothspotting CD Cleo 00224-2 USA
“Suicide” (’98) The Black Bible CD Cleo 00387 USA
“Christine” (‘00) Remix Collection-Gothic Industrial CD Cleo 00914-2 USA
“Nazarene” (’00) This Is Goth CD Cleo USA
"Christine" ('00) Dark Noise 2000 CD Cleo USA
“Christine” (’03) Dancing On Your Grave CD Cleo USA
“Nazarene” (‘04) Gothika CD Cleo 001334-2 USA
"Watchtower" ('04) Various - Strobelights Vol 1 CD Strob 006 (Strobelight Records) Austria
“Christine” (‘05) Goth Industrial Club Anthems CD Cleo 1466 USA
“Nazarene” (‘06) This Is Gothic – The Bat Cave Anthology CD Cleo 01606-2 USA
“Sideshow” (‘06) Gothik – Special Anniversary Edition CD Cleo 01610-2 USA
“SIDESHOW” (’06) The Goth Anthology: Underground Anthems From Rock’s Dark Side CD Metro Music Uk
"Suicide" ('07) Various - Gothic Compilation Part Xxxvi CD Bat 038 (Batbeliever Releases) Germany
“Christine” (‘08) Goth As F__K Special Limited Edition 12” Vinyl Cleo 02093-1 USA
"Sheet Metal Eyes" ('11) Various - Another Gift From Goth - 90'S Gothic Rock Compilation CD Strob 036 (Strobelight Records) Austria

External links
The Wake (the official site)
The Wake (official Reverbnation page)
The Wake (official myspace page)
The Wake (2)
The Wake (2)
The Unofficial THE WAKE Discography

American gothic rock groups
Alternative rock groups from Ohio
Musical groups from Columbus, Ohio